SN-22 is a chemical compound which acts as a moderately selective agonist at the 5-HT2 family of serotonin receptors, with a Ki of 19nM at 5HT2 subtypes vs 514 nM at 5-HT1A receptors. Many related derivatives are known, most of which are ligands for 5-HT1A, 5-HT6 or dopamine D2 receptors or show SSRI activity.

See also 
 BRL-54443
 LY-334370
 LY-367,265
 MPMI
 MPTP
 Naratriptan
 N,N-Dimethyltryptamine
 RU-24969
 Sertindole

References 

Serotonin receptor agonists